is an autobahn in Germany that connects the border to the Netherlands near Venlo in the northwest to the interchange with A 6 near Hockenheim. In 1965, this required a redesign of the Hockenheimring.

The autobahn runs parallel to the A 3 on the opposite side of the Rhine. Between Mönchengladbach and Bergheim in the north and Worms, Ludwigshafen and Speyer in the south, it cuts through the landscapes of Eifel and Hunsrück, avoiding areas of dense population while still in proximity to Cologne, Bonn, Koblenz and Bingen.

The A 61, built in the 1970s, is the most  western connection from the Netherlands and Belgium to southern Germany so many trucks and tourists from these countries frequent the A 61.

Between Kreuz Mönchengladbach and Wanlo, the speed limit is 120 km/h.

The section between the junctions Wanlo and Jackerath was upgraded to three lanes in 2005. The speed limit there is 130 km/h, paid for by RWE Power that in return received permission to close a section of A 44 for their Garzweiler surface mining operation. By 2017, the A 44 will be restored and the Wanlo-Jackerath-section of the A 61 will be closed instead.

Between Dreieck Erfttal and Kreuz Bliesheim the A 1 and A 61 run concurrently. The motorway has three lanes each way and a variable speed limit here.

Since 4 April 2012, the A 61 continues into the Netherlands as A74. This short motorway connects the A 61 at the border with the Dutch A 73. Previously, all traffic had to go through the city of Venlo.

Part of the A61 motorway near the village of Gelsdorf had been designed for use as a runway to service travel to the nearby Government bunker facility and in an emergency a section would have been dedicated for use as an airport with spacious aircraft parking spaces at both ends disguised as roadside car parks.

Exit list 

|-
|colspan="2"|
|Netherlands 

 (new exit)

 

   
 

   

|}

References

External links 

61
A061
A061
A061